Dick Annegarn (born in The Hague, 6 May 1952) is a Dutch rock singer-songwriter who sings mostly in French, and occasionally in Dutch and English.

Discography

Albums
 Sacré Géranium (1974)
 Dicks (1974)
 Je te vois (1974)
 Mireille (1975)
 Anticyclone (1976)
 De ce spectacle ici sur terre (live, 1978)
 Ferraillages (1980)
 Citoyen (1981)
 140 BL (live, 1984)
 Frère ? (1986)
 Ullegarra (1990)
 Chansons fleuves (1990)
 Dick (1992)
 Approche-toi (1997)
 Adieu Verdure (1999)
 Au Cirque d'Hiver (live, 2000)
 Un' ombre (2002)
 Plouc (2005)
 Soleil du soir (2008)
 Folk Talk (2011)
 Vélo va (2014)
 Twist (2016)
 12 Villes 12 Chansons (2018)

Singles
 Va (1975)
 Lille CD promo (1998)
 Voleur de chevaux CD promo (1999)

Compilations 
 Bruxelles (3 first albums + part of the 4th one+ the songs Va and Les Gueux) (1996)
 Les Années nocturnes (Frères ?, Ullegara and Chansons fleuves) (2007)

Contributions
 Egmont and the FF Boom, featuring Daniel Schell (1978 ?)
 Route Manset (1996)
 Aux suivants, Hommage à Jacques Brel (2003)
 Plutôt tôt Plutôt tard (2005, tôt ou tard)

Tribute album
 Le Grand Dîner or Tribute à Dick Annegarn (2006, tôt ou tard), on which he himself contributes

References

External links
 Official website

1952 births
Living people
Dutch male singers
Dutch singer-songwriters
Musicians from The Hague
French-language singers
English-language singers from the Netherlands
Alumni of the European Schools